Kayamkulam Kochunni is a 1966 Indian Malayalam-language period drama film written, produced and directed by P. A. Thomas. Dialogues were written by Jagathy N. K. Achary. It is based on the life of the 19th century thief Kayamkulam Kochunni, who is known for stealing from rich and giving to poor. The film stars Sathyan, Adoor Bhasi and Manavalan Joseph and K. J. Yesudas. The soundtrack was composed by B. A. Chidambaranath.

Kayamkulam Kochunni released on 29 July 1966 was a commercial success at the box office. Its sequel, Kaayamkulam Kochunniyude Makan, was released in 1976.

Cast 

Sathyan as Kayamkulam Kochunni
Adoor Bhasi as Ochira Pachu Pillai
Manavalan Joseph as Thommichan
K. J. Yesudas as Khader, A Suruma seller
Muthukulam Raghavan Pillai as Achuthan Nair
T. R. Omana as Achuthan Nair's wife
K. P. Ummer as Diwan
Kaduvakulam Antony as Bava
Kamaladevi as Ayisha
Thikkurissy Sukumaran Nair as Kunjunni Panikkar
Ushakumari as Nabeesa
Sukumari as Vazhapilli Janaki Pillai
Paul Vengola as Kuttan Moosu Thirumeni
Prathapachandran as Kallada Kochu Naanu

Production 
It was the first Malayalam film about the famed highwayman Kayamkulam Kochunni, a Kerala equivalent of Robin Hood. P. A. Thomas who scripted and directed the film produced it under the production banner, Thomas Pictures. The dialogues were written by Jagathy N. K. Achary. The film marks the acting debut of singer Yesudas, who played a pivotal role. The film was shot at the Shyamala Studios in Chennai.

Soundtrack 
The music was composed by B. A. Chidambaranath and the lyrics were written by P. Bhaskaran and Abhayadev.

Reception 
The film was a commercial success at the Kerala box office.

References

External links 
 

1960s historical drama films
1960s Malayalam-language films
1966 films
Films about outlaws
Films directed by P. A. Thomas
Films set in the British Raj
History of Kerala on film
Indian historical drama films
^Kochunni1